Esmee Brugts (born 28 July 2003) is a Dutch professional football player who plays as a forward for Vrouwen Eredivisie club PSV and the Netherlands national team.

Club career
Brugts started playing football with boys as a 5 years old for SV Heinenoord. She moved to FC Binnenmaas eight years later to play there for four years. She was highly sought after when she signed her first contract with PSV at age 16 in 2020. On 13 August 2020 she made her debut for PSV in a pre-season match against Olympique Lyonnais. In her first season at PSV she played 13 league games, scoring three goals. In the final of the KNVB Women's Cup she played the whole match, with PSV defeating ADO Den Haag 1–0. In her second season she played in the final of the 2022 KNVB Women's Cup, losing 2–1 to Ajax.

International
Brugts has played for several Netherlands youth teams. On 16 February 2022 she collected her first senior cap for the Netherlands in a game against Brazil during the 2022 Tournoi de France. She came on the field as a substitute for Victoria Pelova six minutes before the end of the match. She scored her first goal for the national team on 8 April 2022 in a match against Cyprus. On 6 September 2022, she scored a goal in the 93rd minute of the stoppage time in a 1–0 victory over Iceland, to qualify her country as top of Group C to the 2023 FIFA Women's World Cup.

International goals
"Score" represents the score in the match after Brugts' goal. "Score" and "Result" list the Netherlands' goal tally first. Cap represents the player's appearance in an international level match at senior level.

References

External links
 SoccerDonna
 SoccerWay

PSV (women) players
Dutch women's footballers
Netherlands women's international footballers
Eredivisie (women) players
2003 births
Living people
Footballers from South Holland
UEFA Women's Euro 2022 players
People from Hoeksche Waard
Women's association footballers not categorized by position